Maria Larsson (born 24 March 1994 in Gothenburg) is a Swedish runner competing primarily in the 3000 metres steeplechase. She represented her country at the 2017 World Championships without reaching the final.

International competitions

Personal bests

Outdoor
1500 metres – 4:26.92 (Tempe 2014)
3000 metres – 9:27.09 (Gothenburg 2013)
5 kilometres – 16:24 (Carlsbad 2017)
10 kilometres – 34:37 (Stockholm 2016)
3000 metres steeplechase – 9:39.96 (Gothenburg 2017)

References

1994 births
Living people
Swedish female middle-distance runners
Swedish female steeplechase runners
World Athletics Championships athletes for Sweden
Athletes from Gothenburg